Resil Buagas Mojares (born September 4, 1943) is a Filipino historian and critic of Philippine literature best known as for his books on Philippine history. He is acclaimed by various writers and critics as the Visayan Titan of Letters, due to his immense contribution to Visayan literature. He was recognized in 2018 as a National Artist of the Philippines for Literature - a conferment which represents the Philippine state's highest recognition for artists.

Early life and education
Mojares was born to parents who were public school teachers on September 4, 1943 in Polanco, Zamboanga del Norte.

Mojares has a bachelor's degree in English, a master's degree in Literature and postgraduate studies all at the University of San Carlos, as well as a Ph.D. in Literature from the University of the Philippines Diliman.

Career
He was one of the first Cebuanos to become a political prisoner during Martial Law, arrested on September 23, 1972, the day Marcos announced that he had placed the Philippines under Martial law.

A retired Professor at the University of San Carlos (USC) in Cebu City, he was a founding director (1975–96) of USC's Cebuano Studies Center, a pioneering local studies center in the Philippines.

Mojares has authored books on Philippine history, literature, and politics, including studies on three eminent Filipino intellectuals (Pedro Paterno, T. H. Pardo de Tavera, and Isabelo de los Reyes).

He has been a recipient of six Philippine National Book Awards. His books include The War Against the Americans: Resistance and Collaboration in Cebu Province; Aboitiz: Family & Firm in the Philippines; House of Memory: Essays; and Vicente Sotto, The Maverick Senator (Cebuano Studies Center, 1992).

Mojares has been a visiting professor at Kyoto University, the National University of Singapore, and the University of California at Los Angeles where he lectures on "The Philippine Novel" and "Topics in Philippine Cultural History".

Mojares is writing the history of Cebu Province for the Cebu Town History Project.

In 2019, Mojares was recognized as one of the Top 100 Cebuano personalities by The Freeman, Cebu's longest-running newspaper. He was recognized alongside Tomas Osmeña, Max Surban, and Rubilen Amit as part of the centennial anniversary of the local newspaper.

Personal life
Mojares is married to Salvacion Ouano Go, and had four children together. He resides in Barangay Talamban in Cebu City.

Notable works
Origins and Rise of the Filipino Novel: A Generic Study of the Novel Until 1940 (Quezon City, UP Press, 1983; second ed. 1998)
The Man Who Would Be President: Serging Osmeña and Philippine Politics (Cebu: Maria Cacao, 1986)
Waiting for Mariang Makiling: Essays on Philippine Cultural History (Quezon City: Ateneo de Manila University Press, 2002)
Theater in Society, Society in Theater: Social History of a Cebuano Village, 1840-1940 (Quezon City: Ateneo de Manila University Press, 1985)
The War Against the Americans: Resistance and Collaboration in Cebu, 1899-1906 (Quezon City: Ateneo de Manila University Press, 1999)
House of Memory: Essays (Metro Manila: Anvil Publishing, 1997)
Brains of the Nation: Pedro Paterno, T.H. Pardo de Tavera, Isabelo de los Reyes and the Production of Modern Knowledge (Quezon City: Ateneo de Manila University Press, 2006)
Isabelo’s Archive (Metro Manila: Anvil Publishing, 2013).

See also
 National Artist of the Philippines
 Carlos Quirino

References

External links
Asia Research Institute, National University of Singapore
The Haunting of the Filipino Writer by Resil Mojares
UCLA Center for Southeast Asian Studies
USC Awards Emeritus Title to Resil Mojares

1943 births
Living people
People from Zamboanga del Norte
Cebuano writers
Visayan writers
Filipino writers
Writers from Cebu
Academic staff of Kyoto University
Academic staff of the National University of Singapore
University of California, Los Angeles faculty
University of San Carlos alumni
Academic staff of the University of San Carlos
University of the Philippines Diliman alumni